Nissan Yehezkel (born 1971) is an Israeli football manager.

Honours
Israeli Second Division:
Runner-up (2): 2010–11, 2013–14

References

1971 births
Israeli Jews
Living people
Israeli football managers
Hapoel Bnei Lod F.C. managers
Hapoel Rishon LeZion F.C. managers
Hapoel Nir Ramat HaSharon F.C. managers
Hapoel Petah Tikva F.C. managers
Hapoel Marmorek F.C. managers
Maccabi Ahi Nazareth F.C. managers
Hapoel Afula F.C. managers
Bnei Yehuda Tel Aviv F.C. managers
Bnei Sakhnin F.C. managers
Israeli Premier League managers